{{safesubst:#invoke:RfD||2=More "upcoming" no longer upcoming|month = March
|day =  5
|year = 2023
|time = 21:38
|timestamp = 20230305213806

|content=
REDIRECT When You Finish Saving the World (film)

}}